Prambanan Express, commonly abbreviated as Pramex (in English) and Prameks (in Indonesian) is a commuter rail service that operates between Yogyakarta, Special Region of Yogyakarta and Kutoarjo, Purworejo Regency, Central Java in Indonesia. The service, which first operated in 1994, covers a distance of about 64 kilometers and operates using diesel multiple unit trains. It was previously serving Yogyakarta–Solo for 26 years before it was electrified in 2021.

The train was once operated by 6th Operational Area of Yogyakarta of the national railway company, Kereta Api Indonesia (KAI). As part of transition to electrified commuter railway service, KAI's subsidiary KAI Commuter took over the operations of Prameks on 5 October 2020.

History

The predecessor of Prameks was known as Kuda Putih (the White Horse train in English), as there was two horses decoration above of the driver's window. The train had been operating from 1963 to 1980. It was one of the first diesel multiple unit (DMU) ever operated in Indonesia. Because of lacks of spare parts, the service was terminated in 1980s.

Due to the increasing demand from commuters, the rail service was relaunched as Prameks train on 20 May 1994, connects Solo and Yogyakarta. The train consists of four business class passenger cars hauled by a diesel locomotive. In response to the intense enthusiasm for the service, the executive class cars were added. The train was replaced by diesel multiple units manufactured by Nippon Sharyo, Japan. In 2006, the diesel-electric multiple units (DMUs) made by PT Inka Madiun was introduced to support Prameks. Citing the higher enthusiasm of passengers using this train, in 2007 Prameks began opening the Yogyakarta-Kutoarjo-Solo (and vice versa) route. The route is served by three sets of diesel-electric multiple units (DMUs) and five sets of diesel multiple units (DMUs).

While Prambanan Express still serving Yogyakarta, Kutoarjo, and Solo, the train is a mainstay of public transport for the community in these three cities. It was popular among daily commuters as well as tourists who visit this area known as center for Javanese culture and heritage. It was served over 20 trips from Solo to Yogyakarta (and vice versa) at total.

Starting October 2020, the operations of Prambanan Express, previously managed by KAI, were transferred to KAI Commuter after obtaining the operation permit from Ministry of Transportation on 3 June 2020. As the Surakarta–Yogyakarta railway line is electrified, Prambanan Express operations is replaced by the KRL Commuterline Yogyakarta–Solo starting from 10 February 2021. As a consequence, Prameks route is shortened from previously Solo Balapan-Kutoarjo into Yogyakarta-Kutoarjo vice-versa.

Route and fare
Currently the train served by stations across Yogyakarta and Kutoarjo. The train stops at Yogyakarta, Wates, Wojo, Jenar, and Kutoarjo. As of 2021, the fare is Rp8,000 for a single trip for a person

Stations

Rolling stock

Current

Former

Incidents and accidents 

 On 23 October 2012, a ME 201 trainset K3 2 07 01F serving the line as KA 213 on Solo Jebres-Kutoarjo sector derailed at Brambanan station, injuring 40 passengers. The trainset was declared as written off

See also 

 Kereta Api Indonesia
KRL Commuterline
 Rail transport in Indonesia
 List of named passenger trains of Indonesia

References

Transport in the Special Region of Yogyakarta
Transport in Central Java
Regional rail in Indonesia